Jeffrey Derek Clarke (born 18 January 1954 in Hemsworth, England) is an English former footballer who is currently head academy physiotherapist at Scottish Premiership club Dundee United. He played as a defender, primarily for Sunderland and Newcastle United. He has been at Dundee United since November 2003, mainly as physiotherapist for the first team.

Playing career
Clarke began his professional career in 1974 with Manchester City, featuring in thirteen league appearances before leaving a year later to join Sunderland in a swap deal with Dave Watson. In seven years at Roker Park, Clarke played in over 200 matches and experienced promotion to the top flight before moving to rivals Newcastle United on a free transfer in 1982. Another five years in the North East – including another top-flight promotion – preceded short-lived spells at Turkish side Ankaragücü and Darlington.

Physiotherapy career
Following his retirement from playing, Clarke coached at former club Newcastle, studying a physiotherapy degree at the University of Salford at the same time. He graduated in 1996. Clarke became a physio at another former club, Sunderland, before taking on the same role at Leeds United in 2001. Following his redundancy in 2003, he joined Dundee United in November of that year, taking on additional coaching duties at one point in March 2005. By 2020 he was no longer involved with the first team, having been appointed as full-time head physiotherapist within the club's youth academy.

Honours

As a player
Sunderland
Second Division Title winner: 1975–76

References

External links

1954 births
Living people
People from Hemsworth
English footballers
English expatriate footballers
English Football League players
Manchester City F.C. players
Sunderland A.F.C. players
Newcastle United F.C. players
Brighton & Hove Albion F.C. players
MKE Ankaragücü footballers
Darlington F.C. players
Dundee United F.C. non-playing staff
Alumni of the University of Salford
Association football physiotherapists
Footballers from Yorkshire
British physiotherapists
Association football defenders
Expatriate footballers in Turkey